João Jório (born 1900, date of death unknown) was a Brazilian rower. He competed in the men's coxed four event at the 1920 Summer Olympics. He also competed in the water polo tournament at the same Olympics.

References

External links
 

1900 births
Year of death missing
Brazilian male rowers
Brazilian male water polo players
Olympic rowers of Brazil
Olympic water polo players of Brazil
Rowers at the 1920 Summer Olympics
Water polo players at the 1920 Summer Olympics
Place of birth missing